Maximilian Beier (born 17 October 2002) is a German professional footballer who plays as a forward for 2. Bundesliga club Hannover 96, on loan from 1899 Hoffenheim.

Club career
Beier made his professional debut with 1899 Hoffenheim in a 1–0 Bundesliga win over SC Freiburg on 8 February 2020.

On 10 December 2020, he scored two goals and provided an assist for another in a 4–1 win against Genk.

On 19 August 2021, Beier was loaned out to Hannover 96 for one season. The loan was extended for the 2022–23 season on 8 June 2022.

References

External links
 
 
 Bundesliga Profile

2002 births
Living people
Sportspeople from Brandenburg an der Havel
German footballers
Germany youth international footballers
Association football forwards
TSG 1899 Hoffenheim II players
TSG 1899 Hoffenheim players
Hannover 96 players
Bundesliga players
2. Bundesliga players
Regionalliga players
Footballers from Brandenburg